Aaron Avshalomov (11 November 1894 – 16 April 1965) was a Russian-born Jewish composer. His work included several ballets, two operas, a violin concerto, four symphonies and a flute concerto.

Early life 
Born into a Mountain Jewish family in Nikolayevsk-on-Amur, Russia, Avshalomov was sent for medical studies to Zürich. After the October Revolution in 1917, which made further studies in Europe impossible, his family sent him to the United States.

Career 
Less than a year later, he chose to move to China, where he entered the world of Shanghai's academia and, together with other Jewish musicians, who had fled the Russian pogroms and revolution, trained a number of young Chinese musicians in classical music, who in turn became leading musicians in contemporary China. Between 1918 and 1947, he worked to create a synthesis of Chinese musical elements and Western techniques of orchestral composition. Among the first works of this type that he created was the opera Kuan Yin, which premiered in Peking in 1925.

Avshalomov made his main livelihood at bookstores and libraries. He was the head librarian of the Shanghai Municipal Library for 15 years from 1928 to 1943. He conducted the Shanghai Municipal Orchestra from 1943 to 1946.  

In 1947, he moved to the United States, where he already had spent three years in the mid-1920s.

Compositions 
 Kuan Yin (opera named after Guanyin, the bodhisattva of compassion; premiered in Peking in 1925)
 The Twilight Hour of Yan Kuei Fei (opera, 1933), presumably after the 1923 eponymous book by A. E. Grantham.
 The Great Wall (opera, 1933–41), based on the legend of Lady Meng Jiang.
 Piano Concerto in G on Chinese Themes and Rhythms (1935) 
 Flute Concerto
 Violin Concerto
 Symphony No. 1
 Symphony No. 2 (1949, commissioned by Serge Koussevitzky, premiered by the Cincinnati Sym, conducted by Thor Johnson)
 Symphony No. 3 (1953, "To the Memory of Serge and Natalie Koussevitzky")
 Dream of Wei Lin (1949)
 Soul of the Ch'in
 Hutongs of Peking
 Four Biblical Tableaux (Queen Esther's Prayer, Rebecca by the Well, Ruth and Naomi, Processional)

Family 
While living in San Francisco, he married a fellow Russian émigré in San Francisco. In 1919, his son, Jacob Avshalomov was born, who became a  composer and conductor, too.

Death 
He died in New York City on April 16, 1965.

References

1894 births
1965 deaths
20th-century composers
20th-century Russian male musicians
20th-century American composers
20th-century American male musicians
Russian composers
Russian male composers
Russian Jews
American male composers
American people of Mountain Jewish descent
American people of Russian-Jewish descent
Emigrants from the Russian Empire to China
Emigrants from the Russian Empire to the United States
Jewish Chinese history
People from Nikolayevsk-on-Amur